Oaks Park is a small amusement park located  south of downtown Portland, Oregon, United States. The park opened in May 1905 and is one of the oldest continually operating amusement parks in the country.

The  park includes midway games, about two dozen rides that operate seasonally, a skating rink that is open all-year, and picnic grounds. It is also home to the Herschell–Spillman Noah's Ark Carousel, a historic wooden carousel constructed in 1912.

History
The park, conceived as an attraction timed to accompany the 1905 Lewis and Clark Centennial Exposition, was built by the Oregon Water Power and Railway Company and opened on May 30, 1905, during a period when trolley parks were often constructed along streetcar lines. It attracted 300,000 visitors during its first season, and continued to attract about that many patrons throughout its first decade of existence. Describing the moral panic of working-class entertainment venues opened at the time, a city council member described Oaks Park as "an immoral place" with "more drunkenness there than he had seen at any place in the City."

In the early 1920s, the park was sold to John Cordray, one of its managers. After Cordray died in 1925, Edward Bollinger, Oaks Park's superintendent, bought all but the land from Cordray's widow; Bollinger acquired the land in 1943. Some of the park's earliest rides included Chute the Chutes, a chute ride that whisked the riders down a steep incline plunging into a small man-made lake; the Barrel of Fun, a funhouse which included screaming skeletons, mazes of mirrors, and dark dead-end hallways; and the Mystic River Ride, a boat ride that traveled through darkened tunnels. The park also featured a floating bathhouse anchored along the river at the south end of the park, as well as a dance pavilion, which attracted famous acts from around the world, including the Boston Symphony Orchestra, the John Philip Sousa Marching Band, and Patrick Conway and his  Band.

In 1948, the Vanport flood submerged Oaks Park for thirty days, killing a third of the bluff's oak trees, warping most of the rides, and resulting in damage to the rink that took five months to repair; the next year, Bollinger's son Robert took over after his father's death. The damage prompted the owners to rebuild the rink floor on airtight iron barrels, which would float in the event of another flood; the floats worked as planned during the area's Christmas flood of 1964 and the Willamette Valley Flood of 1996.

For many years, three steam locomotives were kept at the park, on static display. These included Southern Pacific 4449, from 1958 to 1974; Spokane, Portland and Seattle 700, from 1958 to 1986; and Oregon Railroad & Navigation Co. 197, from 1958 to 1996. Although no longer at Oaks Park, the three locomotives all remain in Portland, and since 2012 they are residing at the Oregon Rail Heritage Center. Two years after the Jantzen Beach Amusement Park closed in 1970, the Oregon Journal reported Oaks Park "may be on the verge of a renaissance"; three years later Sellwood's local newspaper, The Bee, reported "30,000 people a month still come during the summer."

In 1985, Robert Bollinger donated Oaks Amusement Park to the 501(c)(3) non-profit Oaks Park Association, which continues to operate the park to this day.  The mission of the Oaks Park Association is the preservation and perpetuation of the historic amusement park as an affordable, safe, and family-friendly recreation attraction open to the general public.

The park gained recognition for its appearance in Free Willy. Many of the current and former attractions like Screamin' Eagle appeared in the movie as do the trailer Randolph reside while the roller skating rink served as the entrance to the aquatic theater where Willy was held captive in a tank which was actually shot at Six Flags México (formerly Reino Aventura) in Mexico.

The park celebrated 100 years of continuous operation in 2005, making it among the oldest in the U.S.

Attractions

Current attractions

Park rides and midway games are open weekends during spring and daily during summer. Rides include the following:

Roller coasters

South End

East End

North End

Chipper's Woods Miniature Golf (new for 2011)

Roller skating rink

The park includes a  wooden roller skating rink, open year-round. The rink has had a pipe organ for most of its history; since 1955 it has been a Wurlitzer model with four manuals, moved to the rink from its previous home at Portland's Broadway Theatre, where it had been installed in 1926. All pipework for the organ is mounted on a platform hanging over the skate floor.

Former rides
The Zip, one of Harry Traver's famous Giant Cyclone Safety Coasters, operated at Oaks Park from 1927 to 1934.
Scenic Railway, a wooden roller coaster that closed in 1935.
Mad Mouse, a wild mouse roller coaster that operated from 1960 to 1976.
Monster Mouse, a wild mouse roller coaster that operated from 1977 to 1995.
Looping Thunder (steel looping roller coaster manufactured by Pinfari). Looping Thunder closed in 2017 to make way for a new Gerstlauer Euro-Fighter Roller coaster.
The Haunted Mine, a dark spook-house ride opened in c. 1970s and was replaced in 2003 by 'Lewis and Clark: The Big Adventure', which closed in 2013 and was replaced by Merry Mix-Up Play Area.
Screamin' Eagle (a KMG Fireball).
Tubs of Fun

See also
 Jantzen Beach Amusement Park
 Lotus Isle
 Springwater Corridor, the former rail line that served the park, now a rail trail

Notes

References

Sources

External links

The park's website

Historical postcards at PdxHistory.com

1905 establishments in Oregon
Amusement parks in Oregon
History of Portland, Oregon
Landmarks in Oregon
Parks in Portland, Oregon
Sellwood-Moreland, Portland, Oregon
Tourist attractions in Portland, Oregon
Willamette River